John Toal is a BBC Radio Ulster and BBC Radio 3 presenter.

A native of Newry he has been a radio presenter since 1989, shortly after he left Queen's University, Belfast where he read for a degree in music.

His Saturday morning radio programme won a gold award at the 2015 Phonographic Performance Ireland (PPI) Radio Awards and another gold award at the 2016 Celtic Media Festival.

On television he has presented Trad Ar Fad! and the BBC NI Last Night of the Proms.

References

External links
The John Toal Show (BBC Radio Ulster)
Classical Connections with John Toal (BBC Radio Ulster)

BBC radio presenters
BBC television presenters
People from Newry
Alumni of Queen's University Belfast
Living people
Year of birth missing (living people)